A Girl, A Man, and a River (1957) is a mystery story by John and Ward Hawkins which was originally written as a seven-part serial for the Saturday Evening Post and published in issues from January 21, 1956 until March 3, 1956.  It was later published as a hardcover book The Floods of Fear  by Dodd Mead/Penguin Putnam in 1956.

It was published as Popular Library #824 in 1957.

The novel was filmed as Floods of Fear in 1959.

Footnotes

External links

1956 American novels
Novels first published in serial form
American mystery novels
Works originally published in The Saturday Evening Post
Dodd, Mead & Co. books
American novels adapted into films